Calliostoma gloriosum, common name the glorious topsnail, is a species of small sea snail with gills and an operculum, a marine gastropod mollusk in the family Calliostomatidae, the calliostoma top snails.

Description
The height of the shell attains 24 mm. The acute shell contain six gently rounded whorls with fine, revolving, thread-like ribs. Four or five ribs near the suture are granulated. The body whorl is roundly carinated. The base of the shell is flattened, with about twenty-five revolving striae. The thick columella is not reflected, but its base is somewhat grooved or depressed behind it. The aperture is about one-third of the length of the whole shell. It is rhomboidal, pearly, and smooth. The shell has a beautiful light salmon color, ornamented near the suture and carina with alternate patches of light yellow and chestnut-brown.

Distribution
This species occurs in the Pacific Ocean off California.

References

External links
 

gloriosum
Gastropods described in 1871